The ACUI Collegiate Pocket Billiards National Championship, in recent years known more specifically as the ACUI Collegiate Nine-ball National Championship, was an amateur United States annual pool competition for university and college students, organized by the Association of College Unions International (ACUI). It was founded in 1937, and was one of ACUI's longest-running programs. In June 2020, the ACUI made the decision to discontinue their National Collegiate Pocket Billiards program.

Format and other event details 
The championship featured separate men's and women's divisions and champions since 1939.  The event and its regional qualifying tournaments followed Billiard Congress of America (BCA) / World Pool-Billiard Association (WPA) world-standardized rules, and were double-elmiination in format. The championship was a BCA-sanctioned event, with champions listed as such in BCA's Billiards: The Official Rules and Records Book. BCA was involved in the events' promotion to varying degrees over the years, as was the Billiard Education Foundation (which operates the Junior National Nine-ball Championships, sometimes held jointly with the ACUI event since 2005).  First- through fourth-place prizes were scholarship funds, ranging from US$1,000 down to $100 

The championships were usually held in May or June, with qualifying local tournaments held at individual educational institution campuses (or nearby facilities) during the fall and spring semesters. Regional, multi-state playoffs were held toward the end of the spring semester over a weekend, alongside other ACUI competitions, including table tennis, and College Bowl-style trivia.

Name 
The name of the ACUI championship changed over time, reflecting the particular pool discipline featured in the event. It was most recently known as the ACUI Collegiate Nine-ball National Championship (among various shorter formulations).  Collectively, the events were known as the ACUI Collegiate Pocket Billiards National Championships (among shorter formulations). The event was sometimes referred to as international, owing to ACUI's name, but was a US national title.

Champions and records 

History of ACUI Billiards Champions since 1937:

Men's Champions

Women's Champions 

The 2015 winners and runners-up:

First place: Briana Miller of Lindenwood University (defending 2014 division champion; 2010 Super Billiards Expo Nine-ball Champion (women's); former multi-year BEF Junior National Champion and 2010 WPA World Juniors runner-up; pro-am competitor in the WPBA since age 13)
Second place: Alex Bayless of Southern Illinois University–Edwardsville
Third place: Rachny Soun of James Madison University, Virginia

First place: Landon Shuffett of Lindenwood University, Missouri (defending 2014 division champion; Kentucky State Men's Nine-ball Champion; and former multi-year BEF Junior National Champion)
Second place: Sharik Sayed of Lindenwood University
Third place: Touy Bouapha of Madison Area Technical College, Wisconsin

 the player with the record number of first-place titles was Eleanor Callado, then of San Francisco State University, California, winning the women's division four times, in 2003 and 2005–2007 (taking second place in 2004).

References

External links 
 ACUI Billiards official homepage

Pool competitions
College sports championships in the United States
Pocket billiards